Niharika Konidela (born 18 December 1993) is an Indian actress and producer who predominantly works in Telugu films. She made her debut with the film Oka Manasu (2016). She produces films and web series under her banner "Pink Elephant Pictures".

Early and personal life 
Niharika Konidela is the daughter of actor and producer Nagendra Babu. She is the niece of actors Chiranjeevi and Pawan Kalyan. Her brother Varun Tej and cousins Ram Charan, Sai Dharam Tej, Allu Arjun, Allu Sirish, and Vaisshnav Tej are also actors in Telugu cinema.

She married Chaitanya Jonnalagadda on 9 December 2020, at Udaipur's Oberoi Udaivilas.

Career
Konidela worked as a presenter on Telugu language television before pursuing a career as an actress. She has hosted Dhee Ultimate Dance Show for Segments Dhee Junior 1 and Dhee Junior 2 aired on ETV Network.

She acted and also produced the Telugu web-series Muddapappu Avakai under her banner Pink Elephant Pictures. This series was released on YouTube and was well received by the audience.

In September 2015, she signed for a film titled Oka Manasu which marked her debut as an actress. Her 2019 film, Suryakantham, performed poorly at the box office, grossing 30 million. Later that year, she played a minor role in the historical action film Sye Raa Narasimha Reddy.

Pink Elephant Pictures
In 2015, Konidela launched her film production company, Pink Elephant Pictures.

Filmography

Film
 All films are in Telugu unless otherwise noted.

Television

References

External links
 
 

Actresses in Tamil cinema
Living people
Actresses in Telugu cinema
Indian film actresses
21st-century Indian actresses
1991 births
Actresses in Telugu television
Indian television producers
Telugu actresses
Actresses from Hyderabad, India